This is a list of Toyota Racing Series drivers, that is, a list of drivers who have made at least one race start in the Toyota Racing Series. This list is accurate up to the final round of the 2021 Toyota Racing Series.

By name

By nationality

References

 
Toyota Racing Series drivers